Yvette Lambin-Berti is a Monegasque sports administrator and diplomat who served as Monaco Ambassador Extraordinary and Plenipotentiary, Permanent Representative of the Principality of Monaco to UNESCO. She was the Secretary-General of the Monegasque Olympic Committee (COM) for 2020 Tokyo Olympics.

Career 
Lambi-Berti was a certified teacher of physical education and sports in 1974 and taught the course until 1986 when she became the Administrator of the Louis II stadium. She was appointed Deputy Director of National Youth and Sports Education in 1990 and was promoted to head the service in 1993, becoming Commissioner General of the organization in 2005. She was appointed Monaco Ambassador Extraordinary and Plenipotentiary, Permanent Representative UNESCO in 2010. She is the President of the ASM de Natation, Vice-President of the Monegasque Swimming Federation, and serves as the Secretary General of the Olympic Committee.

References 

Monegasque diplomats
Permanent Delegates of Monaco to UNESCO
Living people
Year of birth missing (living people)